Robert J. Benvenuti III (born August 31, 1966) is an American politician and a Republican member of the Kentucky House of Representatives representing District 88 since January 8, 2013.

Education
Benvenuti earned a BA in communication, a BS in science communication and an MPA from the University of Kentucky, and a JD from the University of Kentucky College of Law.

Elections
When District 88 Representative Bill Farmer retired and left the seat open, Benvenuti was unopposed for the May 22, 2012 Republican primary and won the November 6, 2012 general election with 12,959 votes (54.0%) against Democratic nominee Reginald Thomas.

References

External links
Official page at the Kentucky General Assembly
Campaign site

Robert J. Benvenuti III at Ballotpedia
Robert J. Benvenuti III at the National Institute on Money in State Politics

Place of birth missing (living people)
1966 births
Living people
Kentucky lawyers
Republican Party members of the Kentucky House of Representatives
Politicians from Lexington, Kentucky
University of Kentucky alumni
University of Kentucky College of Law alumni
21st-century American politicians